The Soulful Moods of Gene Ammons is an album by saxophonist Gene Ammons recorded in 1962 and released on the Moodsville label.

Reception
The Allmusic review stated "A companion to Gene Ammons' other release on Moodsville, 1961's Nice an' Cool, 1963's Soulful Moods of Gene Ammons picks a slightly less familiar batch of ballads... Ammons himself is typically excellent: few tenors in the '60s had his way with a ballad".

Track listing 
 "Two Different Worlds" (Al Frisch, Sid Wayne) - 4:53     
 "But Beautiful" (Johnny Burke, Jimmy Van Heusen) - 4:27     
 "Skylark" (Hoagy Carmichael, Johnny Mercer) - 6:19     
 "Three Little Words" (Bert Kalmar, Harry Ruby) - 3:49     
 "Street of Dreams" (Sam M. Lewis, Victor Young) - 3:09     
 "You'd Be So Nice to Come Home To" (Cole Porter) - 4:17     
 "Under a Blanket of Blue" (Jerry Livingston, Al J. Neiburg, Marty Symes) - 5:12     
 "I'm Glad There Is You" (Jimmy Dorsey, Paul Mertz) - 6:02

Personnel 
Gene Ammons - tenor saxophone
Patti Bown - piano
George Duvivier - bass
Ed Shaughnessy - drums

References 

1963 albums
Albums recorded at Van Gelder Studio
Moodsville Records albums
Gene Ammons albums